Tianmian sauce, also known as sweet bean sauce, sweet flour sauce or sweet wheat paste, is a thick, smooth, dark brown or black paste with either a mild, savory or sweet flavor. It is commonly used in Northern Chinese cuisine, Northeastern Chinese cuisine, as well as Korean-Chinese cuisine. Peking duck and jajangmyeon are two popular dishes that feature the sauce.

Etymology 
The Chinese word tiánmiànjiàng consists of characters meaning "sweet", "flour", and "sauce". It is also called tiánjiàng, which means "sweet sauce". The origin of the Korean word chunjang is unknown. One theory is that it derived from the word cheomjang, which is the Korean reading of the Chinese characters .

Preparation 
Although terms such as "sweet bean sauce" and "sweet bean paste" are used to describe the sauce, it is primarily made from fermented wheat flour. A mixture of approximately 19 portions of wheat flour to one portion of soybean is used. The fermentation starter is made from dried or stale mantou (a steamed bread), wrapped in a variety of muskmelon known as miangua and then bound and hung in a cool, dark place until completely dried. During the fermentation process, the glucose and maltose give the paste its distinctive sweet taste.

Variations and uses

Chinese varieties 
Similar to hoisin sauce, sweet bean sauce may be used in dishes such as Peking Duck. It is also used as a sweeter substitute for saltier yellow soybean paste. In Northern China, the sauce is also eaten with raw scallions.

There are many different types of sweet bean sauces. Recipes and methods of production vary depending on the geographical region and on manufacturer preferences. In northern China, more sugar is added to the sauce. In southern China, mantou flour instead of sugar is commonly used as the main ingredient. Traditionally, high-quality sweet bean sauces owe their sweet flavor to the fermentation of starches rather than to the addition of refined sugar.

Sweet bean sauce can be found in standard Asian supermarkets under various English names. In Chinese, it is written 甜面酱.

Korean chunjang 

In Korea, chunjang is most commonly used to make jajang, a black gravy served with a popular noodle dish called jajangmyeon. Other common dishes with jajang sauce include jajang-bap ("rice with jajang sauce") and jajang-tteok-bokki (stir-fried rice cakes with jajang sauce). Although stir-frying chunjang to make jajang is the most common use for the sauce, chunjang may also be served as an accompaniment to sliced raw onions. In most Korean-Chinese restaurants, raw onions, chunjang, and danmuji (yellow pickled radish) are the basic side dishes.

Korean chunjang is similar to the Shandong-style tiánmiànjiàng, as it was first used in Incheon Chinatown, where the majority of restaurants were run by Chinese immigrants from Shandong. However, now most Korean-Chinese restaurants are run by Koreans, and chunjang has adapted to Korean tastes, as have other Korean-Chinese dishes and ingredients.

Gallery

See also

 Doubanjiang
Peking duck
 Hoisin sauce
 Jajangmyeon
 Teriyaki
Tamari
 Zhajiangmian
 List of Chinese sauces
 List of condiments
 List of fermented soy products

References 

Chinese condiments
Chinese cuisine
Chinese sauces
Korean cuisine